Morelos is one of the 67 municipalities of Chihuahua, in north-western Mexico. The municipal seat lies at Morelos. The municipality covers an area of 1336.8 km².

As of 2010, the municipality had a total population of 8,343, up from 7,172 as of 2005. 

The municipality had 556 localities, none of which had a population over 1,000.

The municipality's name honors Independence War hero José María Morelos.

Geography

Towns and villages
The municipality has 295 localities. The largest are:

References

Municipalities of Chihuahua (state)